{{DISPLAYTITLE:C8H11NO}}
The molecular formula C8H11NO (molar mass: 137.17 g/mol, exact mass: 137.084064) may refer to:

 para-Cresidine
 4-Dimethylaminophenol
 Emoxypine
 2-Hydroxyphenethylamine
 Phenetidines
 Tyramine
 meta-Tyramine